Charles Stein (1 January 1911 – 14 May 1981) was a Luxembourgian middle-distance runner. He competed in the men's 800 metres at the 1936 Summer Olympics.

References

1911 births
1981 deaths
Athletes (track and field) at the 1936 Summer Olympics
Luxembourgian male middle-distance runners
Olympic athletes of Luxembourg
Place of birth missing